The Ultimate Hits Collection may refer to:
 The Ultimate Hits Collection (Johnny Mathis album)
 The Ultimate Hits Collection (Juice Newton album)